The Fundamental Component is the debut studio album American heavy metal band Byzantine. It was released on February 10, 2004.

Track listing

Critical reception 
Reception for the Fundamental Component ranged from slightly to generally positive.

AllMusic felt that the albums' best songs were "unveiling truly progressive and exploratory melodic passages", but that the remainder was hindered by excessive tinkering and split style between metal subgenres.

Disagreeing with these negatives, Lambgoat appreciated the split musical influences, praising both the groove and "hard violence" of the guitars. The variety of vocals also received praise, especially of the control demonstrated when varying between different styles. The review summarised that "any fan of heavy metal should love this album, because there is something for everyone".

Exclaim! also appreciated the instrumental variety, but scorned the quality of OJ's singing as "atrociously meager", with a combined effect that though the album was interesting, several pieces became unbearable.

Personnel 
Chris "OJ" Ojeda – vocals, rhythm guitar
Tony Rohbrough – lead and rhythm guitar
Chris "Cid" Adams – bass
Matt Wolfe – drums
Josh Galeos – mixing
Aaron Fisher – producer/engineer

References 

Byzantine (band) albums
2004 debut albums
Prosthetic Records albums